Laura Sippola (born 1974) is a Finnish pianist and a singer-songwriter based in Helsinki, Finland. She works as a freelance musician and a composer. In 2017 she completed a Doctor of Music degree at the Sibelius Academy, University of the Arts Helsinki.

Discography

Albums (solo)

 Sahara (2004)
 Toinen (2009 Texicalli Records)
 Stadion (2010 Texicalli Records)
 Trenkipoika (2011 Texicalli Records)
 Like Lullaby (2013 Ranka Kustannus)
 Intermezzo (2018 Turenki Records)

EPs
 Mieli (2008 Texicalli Records)

Singles

 "Mä tiedän" (2009 Texicalli Records)
 "Rakkautta vain" (2009 Texicalli Records) (single-edit)
 "Kesäyö" (2010 Texicalli Records)
 "Kaunis mieli" (2011 Texicalli Records) (single-edit)
 "Baby Was a Loner" (2013 Ranka Kustannus)
 "Meidän tie on tämä" (2017 Turenki Records)
 "Intermezzo" (2017 Turenki Records)
 "<3<3" (2017 Turenki Records)
 "Kätees sun" (2018 Turenki Records)
 "Hatsit" (2018 Turenki Records)

As AURAL
 "Nocturne" (2019 Turenki Records)
 "Tuuli" (2021 Texicalli Digital)

Music videos

 "Kesäyö" (2010) by Pauliina Punkki and Johan Karrento
 "Baby Was a Loner" (2013) by Luomustudio
 "Good Girl" (2014) by Pauliina Punkki
 "Special Like You" (2014) by Pauliina Punkki
 "Onnellinen" (2018) by Tuomo Nyyssönen
 "Onnellinen" (2018)
 "Lähiöstrippi" (2019)

Collaborations

 Nova (Rajaton, 2000), as a composer
 Boundless (Rajaton, 2001), as a composer
 Taivaalliset tarinat – Sika myyttien maailmassa (Levanto & Levanto, 2002), as a singer
 Myytävänä elämä (Laura Malmivaara, 2005), as a composer and lyricist
 Revolution Rock – Joe Strummer Memorial Night at Klubi (2006), as a singer
 Uni (Club for Five, 2006), as a composer and lyricist
 Marmoritaivas (Johanna Kurkela, 2007), as a composer, lyricist and arranger
 Nuori mies (500 kg lihaa, 2007), as a pianist
 Ensimmäinen suudelma (Jonna Järnefelt, 2007), as a composer
 Ipanapa 2 (2008), as a singer, pianist, composer, lyricist and arranger
 Lämmin (Riku Keskinen, 2009), as a singer
 "Sulttaani" (Trio Orit, 2012), as a singer and a pianist
 "Lumienkeleitä" (Juurevaa joulua, 2018), as a singer-songwriter

References

External links
 

Living people
Finnish women singer-songwriters
21st-century Finnish women singers
1974 births
Finnish pianists
People from Lapua
21st-century women pianists